Hadj Moussa "Elimane" Coulibaly (born 19 May 1981) is a Malian former professional footballer who played as a right-back.

He was part of the Malian 2004 Olympic football team, who exited in the quarter finals, finishing top of group A, but losing to Italy in the next round.

His cousin, Adama Coulibaly too, plays for Mali.

Honours
MC Alger
 Algerian Cup: 2006, 2007
 Algerian Super Cup: 2006, 2007

Individual
 Algerian League 'Foreign Player of the Year': 2006–07

References

1981 births
Living people
Sportspeople from Bamako
Malian footballers
Association football fullbacks
Mali international footballers
Footballers at the 2004 Summer Olympics
Olympic footballers of Mali
2008 Africa Cup of Nations players
Algerian Ligue Professionnelle 1 players
Libyan Premier League players
AS Bamako players
MC Alger players
Al-Ahli SC (Tripoli) players
Darnes SC players
Malian expatriate footballers
Malian expatriate sportspeople in Algeria
Expatriate footballers in Algeria
Malian expatriate sportspeople in Libya
Expatriate footballers in Libya
21st-century Malian people